Kim Sun-woo (born 19 April 1993) is a South Korea international footballer who plays for Jeju United FC as a midfielder.

Club career

Jeju United FC
Kim signed his first professional contract with Jeju United FC after having almost regularly featured in the South Korea National Football Team Under 20 and Under 23. Kim made 3 successful appearances for the club before he was loaned to Gyeongnam FC.

Gyeongnam FC
After his professional debut with Jeju United FC, Kim was loaned to Gyeongnam FC where he made 18 successful appearances with one goal and one assist to his name.

Jeju United FC
After his season with Gyeongnam FC , Kim returned to Jeju United FC for 2016.

International career

South Korea U-20 National Team
In 2012, Kim got a series of called ups for the South Korea National under-20 Football Team to participate in various international tournaments including FIFA U-20 World cup qualification, Toulose Cup and AFC U-19 Championship . Kim also participated for Valencia Cup in three games for his country. In total, Kim represented his country for 15 games.

South Korea U-23 National Team
In 2012, Kim got a series of called ups for the South Korea National under-23 Football Team to participate in various international tournaments including the King's Cup, Toulose Cup and China friendly Cup. In total, Kim represented his country for 8 games.

Honours

International
South Korea U23
 King's Cup: 2015

References

External links
 
 
 U-19 South Korean Team at Taeguk Warriors
 Korea Republic Under 20 at Soccerway
 Jeju United FC at Soccerway

South Korean footballers
South Korea international footballers
1993 births
Living people
K League 1 players
Jeju United FC players
Gyeongnam FC players
Jeonnam Dragons players
Association football midfielders